Apodostigma is a genus of flowering plants belonging to the family Celastraceae.

Its native range is Tropical Africa and Madagascar.

Species:

Apodostigma pallens

References

Celastraceae
Celastrales genera